Qaradolaq is a municipality and village in the Qakh Rayon of Azerbaijan. It has a population of 186.

References

Populated places in Qakh District